Brian Gottfried and Raúl Ramírez were the defending champions but did not compete that year.

Bruce Manson and Andrew Pattison won the doubles title at the 1978 Paris Open tennis tournament defeating Ion Ţiriac and Guillermo Vilas in the final 7–6, 6–2.

Seeds
Champion seeds are indicated in bold text while text in italics indicates the round in which those seeds were eliminated.

 Robert Lutz /  Stan Smith (semifinals)
 Ion Ţiriac /  Guillermo Vilas (final)
 Ismail El Shafei /  Raymond Moore (semifinals)
 Jean-Louis Haillet /  Gilles Moretton (quarterfinals)

Draw

External links
 1978 Paris Open Doubles draw

Doubles